Asteroceras is an extinct genus of cephalopod belonging to the Ammonite subclass. These fast-moving nektonic carnivores lived during the Triassic and Jurassic periods (from 205.6 to 189.6 Ma).

Species
Asteroceras blakei  Spath, 1925
Asteroceras confusum  Spath, 1925
Asteroceras obtusum  (Sowerby, 1817)
Asteroceras reynesi  Fucini, 1903
Asteroceras saltriensis  Parona, 1896
Asteroceras smithii  (Sowerby, 1814)
Asteroceras stellare  (Sowerby 1815)
Asteroceras turneri  (Sowerby, 1814)

Distribution
Asteroceras fossils may be found in the Jurassic marine strata of Canada, China, Germany, Hong Kong, Hungary, Peru, and Turkey, in the Triassic of United States and at Lyme Regis in the Asteroceras obtusum zone of Upper Sinemurian age.

References

Ammonitida genera
Arietitidae
Jurassic ammonites
Ammonites of Europe
Triassic ammonites
Sinemurian life
Fossil taxa described in 1867